Cycnium tubulosum, also known as the vlei ink-flower and the tissue paper flower, is a slender hemiparasitic perennial plant of the broomrape family. Its range includes much of southern and eastern Africa, from South Africa to Ethiopia, including Madagascar. It has creeping, straggling or upright stems, with few narrow, entire leaves and erect, white or pinkish, slightly zygomorph flowers on a long tube, with five lobes, reminiscent of a Phlox-flower. It may not always be fully dependent on the supply of minerals by other plants, but usually makes connections with the roots of grasses. Its conservation status in South-Africa is "least concern".

Description 
Above the "limb", the corolla becomes an approximately flat disk  in diameter, that splits into five ovate lobes with a rounded margin, with the two lobes at the outside of the curve merged over a greater length than the others. The style does not reach the stamens, and is topped by a thickened, pointy stigma. The plant discolors to black when drying.

Taxonomy 
The plant was first described by Carl Linnaeus the Younger in 1782 as Gerardia tubulosa. Other species that initially were in this genus have later been assigned to Stenandrium (Acanthaceae),  Agalinis (Scrophulariaceae), and Micrargeria (Orobanchaceae). In 1835, George Bentham though the species should be in the genus Rhamphicarpa, and made the new combination R. tubulosa. In his book Die Pflanzenwelt Ost-Afrikas und der Nachbargebiete of 1895, Adolf Engler assigned the species to Bentham's genus Cycnium.

Phylogeny 
Recent DNA-analysis has revealed the evolutionary relationships between many of the species in the broomrape family. Cycnium tubulosum is most related to C. adonense, and more distantly to C. racemosum. The genus Cycnium is monophyletic and the sister group of a clade consisting of the genera Buchnera and Striga. Most related to the clade consisting of Cycnium, Bruchnera and Striga is a clade consisting of Xylocalyx and Graderia. The current insights in these relationships are expressed in the following tree.

Distribution and habitat 
The vlei ink-flower is known from Angola, Botswana, Eswatini, Ethiopia, Kenya, Madagascar, Malawi, Mozambique, Namibia, Nigeria, Rwanda, Somalia, South Africa, South Sudan, Tanzania, Uganda, Zaire, Zambia, and Zimbabwe.

Ecology 
The vlei ink-flower has white or rosy-tinged (sometimes purple) flowers that open in the evening, and have long narrow corolla tubes. These traits all occur in flowers that are pollinated by hawkmoths, although a clear scent was not observed. Hippotion celerio and Nephele comma have been seen to visit C. tubulosum.

References 

Orobanchaceae
Plants described in 1782
Flora of Africa